Todor Ivanov Timonov (born 3 September 1986 in Plovdiv) is a Bulgarian footballer who plays as a midfielder.

Career
Todor Timonov was raised in Botev Plovdiv's youth teams. In 2002 Timonov agreed the conditions of his first professional contract with the club which will be effective for five years. He made his official debut in top division of Bulgarian football as a 17-year-old in a match against Lokomotiv Sofia on 29 November 2003. Todor substituted Stoyan Seymenski in second half and played for 5 minutes. The result of the match was a 0:1 loss for Botev. For four years the young midfielder played in 48 matches for Botev (29 in first division and 15 in second division) and scored 4 goals (1 in first division and 3 in second division). In December 2007 he was loaned for six months in PFC Nesebar. In the summer of 2008, Timonov returned to his first club. A year later, he signed a 3-year contract as a free agent with CSKA Sofia.

On 6 February 2010, CSKA Sofia sold Timonov to Russian Anzhi Makhachkala for a reported transfer fee of $500,000.
On 20 March 2010, he made his official debut for his new team in the 0:1 away loss against Amkar Perm in a Russian Premier League game after coming on as a substitute for Nicolae Josan in the 84th minute of the match.

On 6 November 2010 he was giving a half-time interview to a sideline reporter during a league game on live TV and said "If we score a penalty, everything will be fucking great." Anzhi manager Gadzhi Gadzhiev said that Timonov probably didn't quite know that what he was saying was a swear word, but he will be fined by the club for the incident nevertheless.

References

External links
 

1986 births
Living people
Footballers from Plovdiv
Bulgarian footballers
Bulgarian expatriate footballers
Association football midfielders
Botev Plovdiv players
PFC CSKA Sofia players
FC Anzhi Makhachkala players
PFC Lokomotiv Plovdiv players
Anagennisi Karditsa F.C. players
FC Vereya players
FC Maritsa Plovdiv players
First Professional Football League (Bulgaria) players
Russian Premier League players
Expatriate footballers in Russia
Expatriate footballers in Greece